Urmas Viilma (born 13 August 1973) is an Estonian prelate and current archbishop of Tallinn and subsequently Primate of the Estonian Evangelical Lutheran Church.

Biography
Viilma was ordained a deacon on 2 May 1993 in St Michael's church in Keila by Bishop Einar Soone. On 15 September 1998 he was ordained a priest in St Mary's Cathedral, Tallinn by Archbishop Jaan Kiivit Junior. On 26 November 2014, he was elected to the Estonian Evangelical Lutheran Synod by the archbishop. He was ordained a bishop and was appointed Archbishop on 2 February 2015. He was consecrated by bishop Einar Soone, bishop Andres Taul and bishop Andres Põder.

Career
After ordination as a deacon, Viilma was appointed as deacon in the parish of Keila. The same year he was appointed as deacon in the parish of Parnu-Jacobi, holding this post till 1998. Between 1998 and 2004 he was pastor of Pärnu-Jakobi. He also worked in the Pärnu Provincial Support Office between 1999 and 2003. He was also pastor of the parish of Mihkli, Tõstamaa and Vigala, respectively and simultaneously, between 1999 and 2004. Later he also held various positions within the Lutheran church of Estonia notably the head of the council of the Diocese of Tallinn between 2010 and 2015.

References

1973 births
Estonian Lutheran clergy
Lutheran archbishops of Tallinn
Estonian Lutheran bishops
21st-century Lutheran bishops
21st-century Lutheran archbishops
People from Tallinn
Living people